José María Miró (18 September 1872 – 16 June 1946) was a Spanish sports shooter. He competed in two events at the 1920 Summer Olympics.

References

External links
 

1872 births
1946 deaths
Spanish male sport shooters
Olympic shooters of Spain
Shooters at the 1920 Summer Olympics
Sportspeople from Montevideo
20th-century Spanish people